Former tennis player John McEnroe won a total of 155 ATP titles, 77 in  ATP Tour singles, 78 in men's doubles, and 1 in mixed doubles (not counted as ATP title). He won 25 singles titles on the ATP Champions tour. He won seven Grand Slam singles titles. He also won a record eight year end championship titles overall, the Masters championships three times, and the WCT Finals, a record five times. His career singles match record was 875–198 (81.55%). He posted the best single-season match record (for a male player) in the Open Era with win–loss record: 82–3 (96.5%) set in 1984 and has the best carpet court career match winning percentage: 84.18% (411–65) of any player. McEnroe was the second male player to reach 3 consecutive Grand Slams finals in a calendar year in 1984 since Rod Laver reached all four grand slams finals in 1969 in open era.

According to the ATP website, McEnroe had the edge in career matches on Jimmy Connors (20–14), Stefan Edberg (7–6), Mats Wilander (7–6), Michael Chang (4–1), Ilie Năstase (4–2), and Pat Cash (3–1). McEnroe was even with Björn Borg (7–7), Andre Agassi (2–2), and Michael Stich (1–1), but trailed against Pete Sampras (0–3), Goran Ivanišević (2–4), Boris Becker (2–8), Guillermo Vilas (5–6), Jim Courier (1–2), and Ivan Lendl (15–21). McEnroe won 12 of his last 14 matches with Connors, beginning with the 1983 Cincinnati tournament. Edberg won his last 5 matches with McEnroe, beginning with the 1989 tournament in Tokyo. McEnroe won 4 of his last 5 matches with Vilas, beginning with the 1981 tournament in Boca Raton, Florida. Lastly, Lendl won 11 of his last 12 matches with McEnroe, beginning with the 1985 US Open.

McEnroe, however, played in numerous events, including invitational tournaments, that are not covered by the ATP website. He won eight of those events and had wins and losses against the players listed in the preceding paragraph that are not reflected on the ATP website. McEnroe has also won a number of titles on the senior and legends tours.

Grand Slam finals

Singles: 11 (7 titles, 4 runner–ups)

Doubles: 12 (9 titles, 3 runner-ups)

Mixed doubles: 1 (1 title)

Grand Prix year-end championships finals

Singles: 4 (3 titles, 1 runner–up) 

Note: during this period the year-end championships were called the Grand Prix Masters and were played in January of the following year.

WCT year-end championships finals

Singles: 8 (5 titles, 3 runner–ups)

Grand Prix Super Series finals

Singles: 26 (19 titles, 7 runner-ups) 

Note: before the ATP took over running the men's professional tour in 1990 the Grand Prix Tour had a series of events that were precursors to the Masters Series known as the Grand Prix Tennis Super Series.

ATP Career finals

Singles (109)

Titles (77)

Runner-ups (32)

Exhibition events

Exhibition events 

Here are McEnroe's tournament titles that are not included in the statistics on the Association of Tennis Professionals website. The website has some omissions for tournaments held since 1968.

Sources for this section
Michel Sutter, Vainqueurs Winners 1946–2003, Paris, 2003. Sutter has attempted to list all tournaments meeting his criteria for selection beginning with 1946 and ending in the fall of 1991. For each tournament, he has indicated the city, the date of the final, the winner, the runner-up, and the score of the final. A tournament is included in his list if: (1) the draw for the tournament included at least eight players (with a few exceptions, such as the Pepsi Grand Slam tournaments in the second half of the 1970s); and (2) the level of the tournaments was at least equal to the present day challenger tournaments.
John Barrett, editor, World of Tennis Yearbooks, London, from 1976 through 1993.

Doubles (99)

Titles: (78)

Runner-ups: (21) 
{{efn|ATP sources wrongly list Walts and Gullikson as champions so LA 1981 isn't included. McEnroe and Taygan actually won the title.

Senior tour titles

ATP Champions Tour

Singles finals: 39 (25 titles, 14 runners-up)

Legends over 45 doubles

2008: Champions Cup Boston – defeated Aaron Krickstein 5–7, 6–3, [10–5]
2009: Rio Champions Cup – defeated Jim Courier 6–2, 6–3

Performance timelines

Singles

Doubles

Record against No. 1 players
McEnroe's match record against players who have been ranked world No. 1.

See also
 Borg-McEnroe rivalry
 Lendl–McEnroe rivalry
 Connors-McEnroe rivalry

Notes

References

External links
 
 
 

Statistics
Tennis career statistics